The 2013 Queensland Cup season was the 18th season of Queensland's top-level statewide rugby league competition run by the Queensland Rugby League. The competition, known as the Intrust Super Cup due to sponsorship from Intrust Super, featured 12 teams playing a 26-week long season (including finals) from March to September.

The Mackay Cutters won their first premiership after defeating the Easts Tigers 27–20 in the Grand Final at North Ipswich Reserve. Easts Tigers'  Cody Walker was named the competition's Player of the Year, winning the Courier Mail Medal.

Teams
In 2013, the lineup of teams remained unchanged for the fifth consecutive year. After partnering with the Gold Coast Titans since 2007, the Ipswich Jets became an affiliate of the Brisbane Broncos.

Ladder

Finals series

Grand Final

Easts, who finished the regular season in third, qualified for their third Grand Final after upsetting the second-placed Mackay in Week 1 and the first-placed Northern Pride in the major semi final. Mackay, after losing to Easts, defeated Ipswich in the minor semi final and upset the Pride 20–6 in the preliminary final to qualify for their first Grand Final.

First half
Easts were the first team to get on the board in the decided when centre Junior Sa'u scored in the 9th minute. In the 25th minute, they extended their lead to eight when Mackay put a dropout out on the full, kicking a penalty goal from right in front. The Cutters finally cracked the Tigers when winger Bureta Faraimo crossed in the right corner in the 29th minute. They took the lead for the first time when Faraimo scored his second in the 32nd minute, sprinting 50 metres down the sideline after a pass from his centre Michael Morgan. The lead didn't last long, as Easts scored in the 38th minute, when Sa'u latched onto a kick that the Cutters let bounce to score his second try.

Second half
Mackay levelled the scores at 14-all seven minutes into the second half when winger David Milne scored in the left corner. In the 64th minute, Mackay captured their second lead of the contest when Morgan picked up a loose ball and ran 50 metres to score in the right corner. Again, the lead did not last long, as Easts' prop Mitch Garbutt muscled over to score in the 69th minute. The Cutters took a one-point lead when halfback Matt Minto slotted a field goal from 20 metres out with six minutes left in the game. Mackay sealed the win in the 79th minute when hooker Anthony Mitchell darted from dummy half to score and secure the club's first Queensland Cup premiership. Mitchell was awarded the Duncan Hall Medal for Man of Match.

A North Queensland Cowboys feeder club, the Cutters' side featured Michael Morgan and Jason Taumalolo, who would both go on to become NRL regulars for the Cowboys and play in the club's 2015 NRL Grand Final win over the Brisbane Broncos.

End-of-season awards
 Courier Mail Medal (Best and Fairest): Cody Walker ( Easts Tigers)
 Coach of the Year: Jason Demetriou ( Northern Pride)
 Rookie of the Year: Cameron Munster ( Central Queensland Capras)
 Representative Player of the Year: Nick Slyney ( Queensland Residents,  Redcliffe Dolphins)
 XXXX People's Choice Award: Hezron Murga ( Northern Pride)

See also

 Queensland Cup
 Queensland Rugby League

References

2013 in Australian rugby league
Queensland Cup